La Unión is a province of the Arequipa Region in Peru. Its seat is Cotahuasi.

Geography 
The Huanzo mountain range traverses the province. Other mountains are listed below:

Political division
The province is divided into eleven districts which are
Alca
Charcana
Cotahuasi (Province Seat)
Huaynacotas
Pampamarca
Puyca
Quechualla
Sayla
Tauria
Tomepampa
Toro

Ethnic groups 
The people in the province are mainly indigenous citizens of Quechua descent. Quechua is the language which the majority of the population (59.18%) learnt to speak in childhood, 40.06% of the residents started speaking using the Spanish language (2007 Peru Census).

See also 
 Cotahuasi Subbasin Landscape Reserve
 Ikmaqucha
 Mawk'allaqta
 Wansuqucha

Sources

External links
  
 El Portal de Cotahuasi Spanish
 Cotahuasiweb English

Provinces of the Arequipa Region